The Moscow Conservatory, also officially Moscow State Tchaikovsky Conservatory  is a musical educational institution located in Moscow, Russia. It grants undergraduate and graduate degrees in musical performance and musical research. The conservatory offers various degrees including Bachelor of Music Performance, Master of Music and PhD in research.

History
It was co-founded in 1866 as the Moscow Imperial Conservatory by Nikolai Rubinstein and Prince Nikolai Troubetzkoy. It is the second oldest conservatory in Russia after the Saint Petersburg Conservatory. Pyotr Ilyich Tchaikovsky was appointed professor of theory and harmony at its opening. Since 1940, the conservatory has borne his name.

Choral faculty
Prior to the October Revolution, the choral faculty of the conservatory was second to the Moscow Synodal School and Moscow Synodal Choir, but in 1919, both were closed and merged into the choral faculty. Some of the students now listed as being of the conservatory were in fact students of the Synodal School.

Great Hall
A renovation of the hall was completed in 2011.

Some notable graduates

Valery Afanassiev (b. 1947) – pianist
Nelly Akopian-Tamarina – pianist
Ashot Ariyan (b. 1973) – composer and pianist
Eduard Artemyev (b. 1937) – composer
Vladimir Ashkenazy (b. 1937) – pianist, conductor
Vladimir Bakaleinikov (1885-1953) – violist, composer, conductor
Stanisław Barcewicz (1858-1929) – violinist
Rudolf Barshai (1924-2010) – violist, conductor
Dmitri Bashkirov (1931-2021) – pianist
Yuri Bashmet (b. 1953) – violist, conductor
Boris Berezovsky (b. 1969) – pianist
Boris Berman (b. 1948) – pianist
Lazar Berman (1930-2005) – pianist
Pavel Berman (b. 1970) – violinist, conductor
Vadim Borisovsky (1900-1972) – violist
Anatoliy Brandukov (1859-1930) – cellist
Alexander Chuhaldin (1892-1951)–  violinist, conductor, composer
Tish Daija (1926-2003) – Albanian composer
Đặng Thái Sơn (b. 1958) – pianist
Bella Davidovich (b. 1928) – pianist
Nikolai Demidenko (b. 1955) – pianist
Edison Denisov (1929-1996) – composer
Vladimir Denissenkov (b. 1956) – accordionist
Fyodor Druzhinin (1932-2007) – violist
Youri Egorov (1954-1988) – pianist
Samuil Feinberg (1890-1962) – pianist, composer
Frank Fernandez (b. 1944) – pianist, composer
Yakov Flier (1912-1977) – pianist
Andrei Gavrilov (b. 1955) – pianist
Misha Geller (1937-2007) – composer, violist
Emil Gilels (1916-1985) – pianist
Marina Goglidze-Mdivani (b. 1936) – pianist
Alexei Gorokhov (1927-1999) – violinist, musicologist
Vera Gornostayeva (1929-2015) – pianist
Sofia Gubaidulina (b. 1931) – composer
Maria Grinberg (1908-1978) – pianist
Natalia Gutman (b. 1942) – cellist
Rustem Hayroudinoff – pianist
Andrej Hoteev (b. 1946) – pianist
Waleed Howrani (b. 1948) – composer, pianist
Rinat Ibragimov (1960-2020) – double bassist, conductor
Valentina Igoshina (b. 1978) – pianist
Konstantin Igumnov (1873-1948) – pianist
Ilya Itin (b. 1967) – pianist
Dmitry Kabalevsky (1904-1987) – composer, pianist
Olga Kern (b. 1975) – pianist
Aram Khachaturian (1903-1978) – composer
Yuri Kholopov (1932-2003) – musicologist
Vladimir Khomyakov (b. 1984) – pianist
Tikhon Khrennikov (1913-2007) – composer
Igor Khudolei (1940-2001) – pianist
Olga Kiun – pianist
Pavel Klinichev – conductor
Leonid Kogan (1924-1982) – violinist
Pavel Kogan (b. 1952) – violinist, conductor
Evgeni Koroliov (b. 1949) – pianist
Serguei Kostiuchenko (b. 1965) – Belarusian conductor
Ivan Kotov (1950-1985) – bassist
Vladimir Krainev (1944-2011) – pianist
Gidon Kremer (b. 1947) – violinist
Eduard Kunz (b. 1980) – pianist
Ina Lange (1846-1930) – pianist; later music historian and writer
Elisabeth Leonskaja – pianist
Josef Lhévinne – pianist
Rosina Lhévinne – pianist
Dong-Hyek Lim – pianist
Alexei Lubimov – pianist
Nikolai Lugansky – pianist
Radu Lupu – pianist
Anna Saulowna Lyuboshits – cellist
Dmitry Malikov – pianist, composer, singer
Anna Malikova – pianist
Yevgeny Malinin – pianist
Alexander Malofeev - pianist
Álvaro Manzano (1955-2022) - Ecuadorian conductor
Emanuil Manolov – pianist, flutist, conductor, composer
Fuat Mansurov – conductor
Denis Matsuev – pianist
Nikolai Medtner – composer, pianist
Victor Merzhanov – pianist
Alexander Mogilevsky – violinist
Roman Moiseyev – conductor
Alexander Mosolov – pianist, composer
Avni Mula – Albanian singer, composer
Shoista Mullodzhanova – Shashmaqam singer
Viktoria Mullova – violinist
Sergey Musaelyan – pianist
Lisa Nakazono-Węgłowska – pianist
Alexandre Naoumenko – singer
Anahit Nersesyan – pianist
Heinrich Neuhaus – pianist
Stanislav Neuhaus – pianist
Tatiana Nikolayeva – pianist
Dmitri Novgorodsky – pianist 
Lev Oborin – pianist
David Oistrakh – violinist
Alexander Osminin − pianist
Aleksandra Pakhmutova – composer
Dmitry Paperno – pianist
Georgs Pelēcis – Latvian composer and musicologist
Nikolai Petrov (1943-2011) – pianist
Gregor Piatigorsky – cellist
Mikhail Pletnev – pianist, composer, conductor
Ivo Pogorelić – pianist
Viktoria Postnikova – pianist
Mikhail Press – violinist
Sergei Rachmaninoff – pianist, composer
Sviatoslav Richter – pianist
Mstislav Rostropovich – cellist and conductor
Gennady Rozhdestvensky – conductor
Nikolai Sachenko (b. 1977) – violinist
Aram Satian – composer
Alexander Scriabin – composer and pianist
Rodion Shchedrin – composer and pianist
Alfred Schnittke – composer
Dmitry Shishkin (b. 1992) - pianist
Leonid Sigal – violinist
Valery Sigalevitch – pianist
Tamriko Siprashvili – pianist
Pyotr Slovtsov – tenor
Galina Konstantinovna Smirnova - composer
Viviana Sofronitsky – pianist
Aleksandr Sokolov – Russian Minister of Culture
Senya Son (b. 1951) – pianist, composer
Alexei Soutchkov – pianist
Vladimir Spivakov – violinist, conductor
Steven Spooner – pianist
Mykola Suk – pianist
Yevgeny Svetlanov – conductor, pianist, composer
Ivan Tasovac – pianist
Marina Tchebourkina – organist, musicologist
Viktor Tretiakov – violinist
Anna Tsybuleva – pianist
Ibrahim Tukiqi – Albanian singer
Pava Turtygina - composer, pianist
Mauricio Vallina – pianist
Saša Večtomov – cellist
Alexander Veprik – composer
Anastasia Vedyakova - violinist and composer
Eliso Virsaladze – pianist
Oleg Volkov - pianist
Mikhail Voskresensky – pianist
Jacob Weinberg – pianist and composer
Çesk Zadeja – Albanian composer
Marina Yakhlakova – pianist
Irina Zaritskaya – pianist
Igor Zubkovsky – cellist

Notable current professors

Yuri Bashmet – viola
Andrei Diev – piano
Andrei Eshpai – composition
Vera Gornostayeva – piano
Natalia Gutman – cello
Alexei Lubimov – piano and historical keyboards 
Valery Popov – bassoon
Kirill Rodin – cello
Natalia Shakhovskaya – cello
Yuri Slesarev – piano
Eliso Virsaladze – piano
Mikhail Voskresensky – piano
Irina Zhurina – voice

References

 The Moscow Conservatory. Information Booklet. Second Edition. Moscow, 2001. .
 Moscow Conservatoire. Moscow, 1994. .
 Moscow Conservatory: Traditions of Music Education, Art, and Science 1866–2006. Moscow: "Moskovskaya Konservatoriya" Publishing House, 2006.

External links

Moscow Conservatory website (in Russian)
Moscow Conservatory website (in English)

 
Music schools in Russia
Educational institutions established in 1866
1866 establishments in the Russian Empire
Arts organizations established in 1866
Cultural heritage monuments of regional significance in Moscow